Gilla (born Gisela Wuchinger , 27 February 1950) is an Austrian singer from the late 1970s disco era.

History
Gilla was discovered by German producer Frank Farian who got her signed to Hansa Records in 1974. After an unsuccessful German cover version "Mir ist kein Weg zu weit" of Marcella Bella's Italian hit single "Nessuno mai", Farian had her record a German disco version of Labelle's "Lady Marmalade". Despite being a modest hit (No. 24), it drew some media attention in Germany from being the first cover with the same explicit lyrics "Willst du mit mir schlafen gehn?" (Do You Want To Sleep With Me) (1975). It was followed later in the year with "Tu es" (recorded in English as "Why Don't You Do It") which became Gilla's biggest hit, peaking at No. 10 in the German charts and giving Farian a commercial breakthrough as a producer. Gilla's debut LP, featuring a mix of disco, pop and schlager tracks, was released shortly after.

In the summer of 1976, Gilla followed with the single, "Ich brenne" (I'm Burning), and re-recorded in English as "Help Help". It was a hit in Holland but fared less well in Germany. Farian remixed the track with his own vocals for Boney M.'s Take the Heat Off Me which replaced "Baby Do You Wanna Bump" in some territories. In early 1977, Gilla's second album Zieh mich aus (Undress Me) was released. Despite featuring German versions of Boney M.'s hit single "Sunny" and Bob Marley's "No Woman No Cry", it fared poorly. The album also included the German version of a future hit for Boney M., "Belfast" which was originally written years earlier for Boney M. member Marcia Barrett.
Gilla's first international album was released in the summer of 1977. Entitled Help Help, it featured her previous English recordings like "Why Don't You Do It" and "Help Help" + their B-sides, as well as English versions of songs from Zieh mich aus. "Gentlemen Callers not Allowed" ("Herrn-Besuche nicht erlaubt") was released as a single and promoted with Boney M.'s charismatic male dancer Bobby Farrell on a few TV shows but it was still only a minor success.

In January 1978, Gilla released a disco-rock cover of The American Breed's "Bend Me, Shape Me". The single was a No. 11 hit in Switzerland and 73 in Australia. It was decided to repackage the Help Help album with the inclusion of the new track and its B-side "The River Sings" ("Der Strom der Zeit") in May, entitled Bend Me, Shape Me. Once again, it was only a minor seller. Singer Bruce Low released a big-selling German cover of Boney M.'s mega-hit "Rivers of Babylon" so Farian decided to have Gilla record a German cover of the follow-up single "Rasputin". Released in November 1978, it was a flop and not even included on the following compilation Star Discothek a few months later.

Trying to repeat the success of "Bend Me, Shape Me", Gilla and her fiancé and co-producer Helmut Rulofs (who was also a recording artist under the name Chris Denning) released another disco-rock cover of The Animals's "We Gotta Get Out of This Place" in March 1979. In 1980, her second English language album Cool Rock'n Roll was released including the title track single and "Go Down Mainstreet". Gilla and Rulofs, however, found bigger success when Farian recorded one of their songs with Boney M. "I See a Boat on the River" being a German Top 10 hit and a European hit single from the million-selling The Magic of Boney M. - 20 Golden Hits, Gilla credited as G. Winger (Winger being an abbreviation of her surname Wuchinger).
In October 1981, Gilla's final single "Cigarillo" backed with a cover of "Friday on My Mind" was released before she retired from the music business. She made a brief return with Rulofs as the duo Sweet Mix in 1982 but their single "Susan Don't Cry for Me" came and went without notice. They also contributed the track "Video" for Precious Wilson's album All Coloured in Love that year.

Being largely forgotten in Europe today, Gilla has in recent years performed regularly in Russia where her records are enjoying considerable popularity.

Discography

Albums
Willst du mit mir schlafen gehn? (1975)
Zieh mich aus (1976)
Help Help (1977) – re-released as Bend Me, Shape Me (1978)
I Like Some Cool Rock'n Roll (1980)

Singles
"Mir ist kein Weg zu weit" / "Wilde Rosen" (1974)
"Willst du mit mir schlafen gehn?" / "Atlantika" (1975)
"Do You Want to Sleep With Me" / "My Decision" (1975)
"Tu es" / "Worte" (1975)
"Why Don't You Do It" / "A Baby of Love" (1975)
"Ich brenne" / "Du bist nicht die erste Liebe" (1976)
"Help Help" / "First Love" (1976)
"Johnny" / "Der Strom der Zeit" (1976)
"Zieh mich aus" / "Lieben und frei sein" (1977)
"Gentlemen Callers not Allowed" / "Say Yes" (1977)
"Bend Me, Shape Me" / "The River Sings" (1978) - AUS #73
"Rasputin" (German Version) / "Laß mich gehen" (1978)
"We Gotta Get Out of This Place" / "Take The Best of Me" (1979)
"I Like Some Cool Rock'n Roll" / "Take Your Time" (1980)
"Go Down Mainstreet" / "Discothek" (1980)
"Tom Cat" / "The Summerwind" (1980)
"Cigarillo" / "Friday on My Mind" (1981)

References

External links
Rate Your Music entry
Gilla Fan site

1950 births
Living people
20th-century Austrian women singers
English-language singers from Austria
French-language singers
Hansa Records artists